Afterlives is a 2020 historical fiction novel by the Nobel Prize-winning Zanzibar-born British author Abdulrazak Gurnah. It was first published by Bloomsbury Publishing on 17 September 2020. Set mainly in the context of the first half of the 20th century, the plot follows four protagonists living in an unnamed town on the Swahili coast of what is now Tanzania from the time of the German colonial rule until a few years after independence. In April 2021, the novel was longlisted for the Orwell Prize of Political Fiction.

Critical reception 
The novel received generally positive reviews. David Pilling of the Financial Times described it as a "book of quiet beauty and tragedy". In a review for The Guardian, Maaza Mengiste praised its narrative details of colonialism and depiction of psychologically complicated relationships, though she felt that the ending was rushed. Referring to the "deliberate exclusion of an African perspective" from historical archives, she concludes: "In Afterlives, he considers the generational effects of colonialism and war, and asks us to consider what remains in the aftermath of so much devastation."

It was selected for The Washington Posts "10 Best Books of 2022" list.

References

2020 British novels
Bloomsbury Publishing books
Novels set in the 20th century
Novels set in Tanzania
Books by Abdulrazak Gurnah